Ankle Tag is a situation comedy series which aired on BBC Radio 4 in 2017 and 2018. The show was aired as a pilot in November 2015 before two series were broadcast from August 2017. It stars Elis James, Katy Wix and Steve Speirs, and was written by Gareth Gwynn and Benjamin Partridge. Series 3 started on 28 May 2020.

Cast
 Elis James as Gruff Evans
 Katy Wix / Margaret Cabourn-Smith as Alice Bishop
 Steve Speirs as Bob Evans

Katy Wix appeared as Alice in the pilot, all episodes of series one and first two episodes of series two. Margaret Cabourn-Smith took over the role of Alice for the final two episodes of series two. Wix returned as Alice for the third series.

Plot
Gruff (Elis James) and wife Alice (Katy Wix) live with their one-year-old daughter Carys. They receive a surprise when Gruff's ex-convict father Bob (Steve Speirs) is released on licence from a fraud conviction, and cons his way into living with them.

Episodes

Pilot

Series One

Series Two

Series Three

Broadcast history
A pilot episode entitled The Beginning was first aired on 18 November 2015.

Three episodes making up series one were broadcast from the 30 August 2017. A second series of four episodes were broadcast weekly from the 31 October 2018. The third series, consisting of six episodes, was aired from 28 May 2020.

Repeats have been aired on both BBC Radio 4 Extra and BBC Radio Wales.

Critical reaction
The Independent described the pilot episode as "original and promising".

It also received a nomination for the Best Scripted Comedy at the BBC Audio Drama awards in 2017.

References

BBC Radio comedy programmes
BBC Radio 4 programmes
2015 radio programme debuts